Trinity Academy is a mixed gender non-selective musical Secondary Academy, located in the Lockleaze area of Bristol, England. It is one of three secondary schools in the Cathedrals Schools Trust (CST) along with Bristol Cathedral Choir School & St Katherine's School. It is situated alongside Stoke Park Primary School.and bishop road

History
In March 2018 Cathedral Schools Trust and Bristol City Council secured £25 million in funding from the Education & Skills Funding Agency, to fund the building of the new school. Trinity Academy opened to students in September 2019, when the school is fully open it will have capacity for 1220 students.

Future
The new school building has now opened.

See also
Bristol Cathedral Choir School

References

External links
Official school website

Secondary schools in Bristol
Educational institutions established in 2019
Church of England secondary schools in the Diocese of Bristol
Academies in Bristol
2019 establishments in England